The UK Singles Chart is one of many music charts compiled by the Official Charts Company that calculates the best-selling singles of the week in the United Kingdom. Since 2004 the chart has been based on the sales of both physical singles and digital downloads, with airplay figures excluded from the official chart. Since 2014, the singles chart has been based on both sales and streaming, with the ratio altered in 2017 to 300:1 streams and only three singles by the same artist eligible for the chart. From July 2018, video streams from YouTube Music and Spotify among others began to be counted for the Official Charts. This list shows singles that peaked in the Top 10 of the UK Singles Chart during 2018, as well as singles which peaked in 2017 and 2019 but were in the top 10 in 2018. The entry date is when the song appeared in the top 10 for the first time (week ending, as published by the Official Charts Company, which is six days after the chart is announced).

Ninety-eight singles were in the top ten this year. Twelve singles from 2017 remained in the top 10 for several weeks at the beginning of the year, while "Nothing Breaks Like a Heart" by Mark Ronson featuring Miley Cyrus, "Rewrite the Stars" by James Arthur and Anne-Marie, "Sweet but Psycho" by Ava Max and "Sunflower" by Post Malone and Swae Lee were all released in 2018 but did not reach their peak until 2019. "Fairytale of New York" by The Pogues featuring Kirsty MacColl charted in the top 10 in 2017 and re-entered in 2018 but did not reach its peak until 2019. "Last Christmas" by Wham!, "Man's Not Hot" by Big Shaq, "17" by MK, "Let You Down" by NF, "River" by Eminem featuring Ed Sheeran and "I Miss You" by Clean Bandit featuring Julia Michaels were the singles from 2017 to reach their peak in 2018. Twenty-four artists scored multiple entries in the top 10 in 2018. Ava Max, Cardi B, Dave, Freya Ridings and Travis Scott were among the many artists who achieved their first UK charting top 10 single in 2018.

“Three Lions (Football's Coming Home)” by Baddiel, Skinner and The Lightning Seeds set two new chart records this year. The single first released ahead of Euro 96 returned to number-one for the fourth time during the 2018 FIFA World Cup, the only single to date to top the chart four times by the same artists. It also suffered the sharpest fall from the top spot, dropping 96 places the full chart week after England were knocked out of the tournament.

The 2017 Christmas number-one, "Perfect" by Ed Sheeran, remained at number-one for the first three weeks of 2018. The first new number-one single of the year was "River" by Eminem featuring Ed Sheeran. Overall, seventeen different singles peaked at number-one in 2018, with Drake (3) having the most singles hit that position.

Background

Multiple entries
Ninety-eight singles charted in the top 10 in 2018, with ninety-three singles reaching their peak this year (including the re-entries "Do They Know It's Christmas?", "Fairytale of New York", "Last Christmas", "Merry Christmas Everyone" and "Rockin' Around the Christmas Tree" which charted in previous years but reached peaks on their latest chart run).

Twenty-four artists scored multiple entries in the top 10 in 2018, with Drake securing the record for most hit singles this year with six.

Introduction of video streaming
In June 2018, the Official Charts Company announced that official video streams from YouTube Music, Spotify, Apple Music and Tidal among other providers would become eligible for the chart from the following month alongside audio streams. “Shotgun” by George Ezra was the first single to reach number-one under the new rules, topping the chart on 5 July 2018 (week ending). His combined sales included around 3 million views of the music video.

“Girls Like You” by Maroon 5 and Cardi B was another single to benefit from the Official Charts Company's inclusion of video streams, rising from 13 to number 10 as the most streamed video of that week.

Drake also claimed his third chart-topper of the year thanks in part to the chart alterations, after "In My Feelings" became the subject of a viral craze, with the public and celebrities recreating dance moves from the music video.

FIFA World Cup effect
“Three Lions” made chart history as the first song to reach number-one on four occasions with the same line-up. The football anthem by Baddiel, Skinner and The Lightning Seeds renewed popularity was fuelled by a young England football team's unexpected success in reaching the FIFA World Cup semi-finals for the first time since 1990. The song's refrain “It's Coming Home” was a soundtrack to the tournament and led to demand for the track.

The single led the iTunes sales chart and Spotify Top 50 chart in the days leading up to the game, but was only announced as number-one on 13 July 2018, two days after the team were eliminated against Croatia.

As a result, the popularity of the song rapidly faded and it set another new record as the fastest falling number-one single in history, dropping ninety-six places to number 97 the following week. This was the steepest chart decline from number-one since "A Bridge over You" by The Lewisham and Greenwich NHS Choir went from Christmas number-one down to number 29 at the end of 2015.

Chart debuts
Forty artists achieved their first top 10 single in 2018, either as a lead or featured artist. XXXTentacion and Travis Scott both reached the top 10 on a second occasion. Cardi B had two other entries in her breakthrough year.

The following table (collapsed on desktop site) does not include acts who had previously charted as part of a group and secured their first top 10 solo single. 

Notes
Ina Wroldsen had previously had a top 10 entry as an uncredited artist when Calvin Harris and Disciples remixed a song she had written and sang on, "How Deep Is Your Love". The song went on to peak at number 2 in 2015. Macklemore joined forces with Rudimental, Jess Glynne and Dan Caplen for the number-one single "These Days". All his previous top 10 singles were alongside Ryan Lewis in the duo Macklemore & Ryan Lewis.

Along with Quavo and Takeoff, Offset is part of the collective Migos whose first top 10 credit came on Calvin Harris' hit single "Slide" in 2017. Benny Blanco took on a lead artist tag for the first time on "Eastside", with Halsey and Khalid providing vocals, after years of chart success as a songwriter (beginning with Katy Perry's "I Kissed a Girl" in 2008). The duo Silk City comprises producer Mark Ronson and DJ and record producer Diplo, who both had top 10 hits to their name, but were making their first appearance together on "Electricity".

Songs from films
Original songs from various films entered the top 10 throughout the year. These included "This Is Me" (from The Greatest Showman), "For You" (Fifty Shades Freed), "All the Stars" (Black Panther), "Shallow" (A Star Is Born and "Sunflower" (Spider-Man: Into the Spider-verse). "Shallow" was the only one of these singles to reach the number-one spot.

Additionally, "Rewrite the Stars" by Anne-Marie and James Arthur also entered the top 10 at number 8, however despite being from The Greatest Showman, this entry was part of The Greatest Showman: Reimagined soundtrack. The original version was sung by Zac Efron and Zendaya in the film.

Best-selling singles
Calvin Harris & Dua Lipa had the best-selling single of the year with "One Kiss". The song spent 12 weeks in the top 10 (including eight weeks at number-one), sold over 1,200,000 copies and was certified 2× platinum by the BPI.  "God's Plan" by Drake came in second place, while George Ezra's "Shotgun", "This is Me" by Keala Settle and "These Days" from Rudimental featuring Jess Glynne, Macklemore & Dan Caplan made up the top five. Singles by Ed Sheeran, Drake ("Nice for What"), George Ezra ("Paradise"), Ariana Grande and Portugal. The Man were also in the top ten best-selling singles of the year.

Top-ten singles
Key

Entries by artist

The following table shows artists who have achieved two or more top 10 entries in 2018, including singles that reached their peak in 2017. The figures include both main artists and featured artists, while appearances on ensemble charity records are also counted for each artist. The total number of weeks an artist spent in the top ten in 2018 is also shown.

Notes 

 "Havana" re-entered the top 10 at number 5 on 11 January 2018 (week ending).
 "Wolves re-entered the top 10 at number 9 on 11 January 2018 (week ending).
 "I Miss You re-entered the top 10 at number 6 on 11 January 2018 (week ending).
 "17" re-entered the top 10 on 11 January (week ending) at number 7, having originally peaked at number 10 in 2017.
 "All I Want for Christmas" re-entered the top 10 on 14 December 2017 (week ending), having originally peaked at number 2 upon release in 1994. It also re-entered the top 10 at number 6 on 13 December 2018 (week ending).
 "Last Christmas" re-entered the top 10 on 14 December 2017 (week ending), having originally peaked at number 2 upon release in 1984. It also re-entered the top 10 at number 7 on 20 December 2018 (week ending).
 "Fairytale of New York" re-entered the top 10 on 14 December 2017 (week ending), having originally peaked at number 2 upon release in 1987. It also re-entered the top 10 at number 10 on 20 December 2018 (week ending) and at number 4 on 3 January 2019 (week ending).
 "Let You Down" re-entered the top 10 at number 10 on 11 January 2018 (week ending).
 Released as a charity single by Band Aid in 1984 to aid famine relief in Ethiopia.
 "Do They Know It's Christmas?" re-entered the top 10 on 4 January 2018 (week ending), having originally peaked at number 1 upon release in 1984.
 "Rockin' Around the Christmas Tree" re-entered the top 10 on 4 January 2018 (week ending), having originally peaked at number 6 upon release in 1962.
 "Merry Christmas Everyone" re-entered the top 10 on 4 January 2018 (week ending), having originally peaked at number 1 upon release in 1985. 
 "Never Be the Same" re-entered the top 10 at number 10 on 15 February 2018 (week ending) and at number 10 on 1 March 2018 (week ending) following a performance on Dancing on Ice.
 "Breathe" re-entered the top 10 at number 10 on 22 February 2018 (week ending).
 "The Middle" re-entered the top 10 at number 9 on 4 May 2018 (week ending).
 "Better Now" re-entered the top 10 at number 10 on 31 May 2018 (week ending).
"Shotgun" re-entered the top 10 at number 10 on 11 October 2018 (week ending), following a performance on Strictly Come Dancing.
 “Leave a Light On” was used by Sony in television adverts for their Bravia OLED TV range.
"I Like It" re-entered the top 10 at number 8 on 2 August 2018 (week ending).
 "Sad!" reached the top 10 for the first time following the death of XXXTentacion. It originally peaked at number 19 in March 2018.
 "Three Lions" originally peaked at number-one upon its initial release in 1996. It had further spells in the top 10 in 2006 and 2010.
 "Three Lions" peaked at number-one again in 2018 following England’s progress to the semi-finals of the 2018 FIFA World Cup. It was announced as a number-one single two days after the team had been knocked out of the tournament by Croatia.
"God Is a Woman" re-entered the top 10 at number 6 on 30 August 2018 (week ending), following the release of the album, Sweetener.
"Lost Without You" re-entered the top 10 at number 9 on 8 November 2018 (week ending), following a performance on Stand Up to Cancer. It also re-entered the top 10 at number 9 on 22 November 2018 (week ending).
"Sunflower" re-entered the top 10 at number 10 on 15 November 2018 (week ending) and at number 9 on 20 December 2018 (week ending).
 Figure includes appearance on Rudimental's "These Days".
 Figure includes appearance on Tiësto & Dzeko's "Jackie Chan".
 Figure includes single that peaked in 2019.
 Figure includes appearance on Maroon 5's "Girls Like You".
 Figure includes single that peaked in 2017.
 Figure includes appearance on Eminem's "River".
 Figure includes appearance on Craig David's "I Know You".
 Figure includes an appearance on the "Do They Know It's Christmas?" charity single by Band Aid.
 Figure includes a top-ten hit with the group Wham!.
 Figure includes single that first charted in 2017 but peaked in 2018.
 Figure includes a top-ten hit with the group Silk City.
 Figure includes appearance on Tyga's "Taste".
 Figure includes appearance on Kodak Black's "Zeze".

See also
2018 in British music
List of number-one singles from the 2010s (UK)

References
General

Specific

External links
2018 singles chart archive at the Official Charts Company (click on relevant week)

United Kingdom top 10 singles
Top 10 singles
2018